La candidata is a Mexican telenovela produced by Giselle González for Televisa. It is an original story about the world of politics. A total of 60 episodes have been confirmed so far.

La Candidata was well received by critics, with its divergence in tone from previous telenovelas and the addressing  of topics, such as political corruption, being particularly praised. It won eight awards at the 35th TVyNovelas Awards, including Best Telenovela of the Year.

Plot 
Like many women, Regina struggles every day for the welfare of her family, having to cope from the worn relationship with her husband to the rebellion of her young son ... but in her case everything is in sight, because she is the wife of Head of Government of the city and, as if that were not enough, an honorable senator, who always tries to do what is best for her fellow men.
In the world of politics, a world where men build power at any cost, is Regina, who strives to improve the reality of people and impose ideals over power.

When Alonso, her husband, decides to run for the presidential candidacy, he shows his true face: ferocious, violent and perverse. He is capable of destroying any political adversary without measuring the consequences, without realizing that he is transforming his best ally, the companion that took him to the most important place of his career, is his main adversary. When Regina is forced to confront her husband, Gerardo, with whom she had a relationship in college, reappears in her life. He is not only the main political rival of Alonso and the man who disputed the presidential chair, but also the one that will try to regain her love. Regina, realizing that her perfect life alongside Alonso, whom she always believed she was in love with and had a child with, is now full of lies and betrayals; and she decides to leave him.

The publication of all the secrets, deceptions, and corrupt actions of Alonso confirm to Regina that her decision was the correct one. She knows that in order to avoid disaster, she must destroy Alonso's whole world and transform his own reality to impose himself in a world full of corruption.
Fate will then lead her to discover that her way is related to politics, but next to an honest man, who supports her unconditionally, even leaving aside his own political ambitions, a man who is there to push and support her ... even when she becomes the candidate.

It is no longer just a political struggle, it is a struggle to defend and change not only Regina's own destiny, but that of an entire country.

Cast

Main 
 Silvia Navarro as Regina Bárcenas
 Víctor González as Gerardo Martínez
 Rafael Sánchez Navarro as Alonso San Román
 Susana González as Cecilia Aguilar

Secondary 
 Nailea Norvind as Teresa Rivera
 Ari Telch as Ignacio
 Helena Rojo as Natalia de San Román
 Patricio Castillo as Omar San Román
 Luz María Jerez as Noemí
 Juan Carlos Barreto as Mario Bárcenas
 Juan Carlos Colombo as Morales
 Verónica Langer as Magda
 Adalberto Parra as Mauro Castillo
 Pilar Ixquic Mata as Isela Aguilar
 Gilberto de Anda as Almirón
 Enrique Arreola as Pacheco
 Irineo Álvarez as Larreta
 José Carlos Ruiz as Presidente del Senado
 Fabiola Guajardo as Florencia
 Fernanda Borches as Daniela 
 Federico Ayos as Emiliano San Román Bárcenas 
 Juan Martin Jáuregui as Hernán 
 Karla Farfán as Ximena Martínez Rivera
 Aleyda Gallardo as Nieves
 Ángel Cerlo as Ochoa
 Ricardo Crespo as Javier
 Bárbara Falconi as Nayeli 
 Michelle González as Marcia
 Fabian Roblez
 Aurora Clavel

Special participation 
 Liz Gallardo as Déborah Rondero
 Fernando Larrañaga as Pablo Contreras
 Tony Marcín as Mother of Hugo

Production
Filming began on August 16, 2016 at Televisa San Ángel.

Casting
Casting for the telenovela began from June through August 2016. Actors Juan Carlos Barreto, Helena Rojo, Luz María Jerez, Nailea Norvind, Ari Telch, Federico Ayos and Adalberto Parra were cast in unknown Roles. On July 13, 2016, Susana González was cast as the sister of the protagonist. Two days later, Rafael Sánchez Navarro was cast as the husband of the protagonist. Blanca Guerra was cast as the titular role, but was replaced by Silvia Navarro because of tight schedule. For the role of the main male protagonist, Mark Tacher, Víctor González and Juan Pablo Medina were nominees, but ultimately the role went to Víctor González.

Reception
Following the premiere, television critic Álvaro Cueva said La Candidata represented a fundamental change for the better of the national television industry. Besides its theme (which he contrasted with previous political telenovelas), Cueva also praised the cinematography, hair and makeup, wardrobe, and music. After the finale, Cueva lauded the creators for the original script and for their depiction of a gritty situation in Mexico, rather than making another remake or Cinderella story.

In November 2016, certain media outlets that support MORENA leader Andrés Manuel López Obrador, a likely presidential candidate, expressed their belief that this television program was created in order to favor former First Lady Margarita Zavala, possible PAN candidate, in the 2018 Presidential Election. In an overview after the show's finale, Milenio commentator Fernando Mejía Barquera mentioned these assertions saying that those "who held this position must have abandoned it during the course of the telenovela because nothing of the main character was reminiscent of the former first lady." With the main character being described as a populist.

Episodes

Awards and nominations

References

External links 
 

Mexican telenovelas
Televisa telenovelas
2016 Mexican television series debuts
2016 telenovelas
2017 Mexican television series endings
Spanish-language telenovelas